Brown Township is the name of six townships in the U.S. state of Indiana:

 Brown Township, Hancock County, Indiana
 Brown Township, Hendricks County, Indiana
 Brown Township, Montgomery County, Indiana
 Brown Township, Morgan County, Indiana
 Brown Township, Ripley County, Indiana
 Brown Township, Washington County, Indiana

See also 
 Brown Township (disambiguation)

Indiana township disambiguation pages